The first League of Armed Neutrality was an alliance of European naval powers between 1780 and 1783 which was intended to protect neutral shipping against the Royal Navy's wartime policy of unlimited search of neutral shipping for French contraband during the American Revolutionary War and Anglo-French War. According to one estimate, 1 in 5 merchant vessels did not make it to port safely due to the British policy. By September 1778, at least 59 ships had been taken prize – 8 Danish (and Norwegian), 16 Swedish and 35 Dutch, not mentioning others from Prussia. Protests were enormous by every side involved.

Beginnings
She endorsed the right of neutral countries to trade by sea with nationals of belligerent countries without hindrance, except in weapons and military supplies. Russia would not recognize blockades of whole coasts but only of individual ports and only if a belligerent's warship was actually present or nearby. The Russian navy dispatched three squadrons to the Mediterranean, Atlantic, and North Sea to enforce this decree.

Denmark-Norway and Sweden, which also ruled Finland, accepting Russia's proposals for an alliance of neutrals, adopted the same policy towards shipping, and the three countries signed bilateral agreements and then a tripartite convention forming the League in August 1780. The intention was to band their ships together in convoys and declare their cargoes not to be contraband although such a declaration would not be accepted by the British. Spain, at war with Britain, pledged to respect the League's neutrality, while Britain demurred. The Netherlands planned to join the League in January 1781, but Britain found out before the treaty could be signed and declared war after it had captured a Dutch ship bearing what the British called contraband. The Netherlands could not thus join a league of neutrals.

The league members remained otherwise out of the war but threatened joint retaliation for every ship of theirs searched by a belligerent. In 1781, Prussia, Austria and Portugal joined the League; in 1782 the Ottoman Empire joined; and in 1783 the Two Sicilies.

As the Royal Navy outnumbered all their fleets combined, the alliance as a military measure was what Catherine later called it, an "armed nullity". Diplomatically, however, it carried greater weight; France and the United States were quick to proclaim their adherence to the new principle of free neutral commerce. Britain, which did not, still had no wish to antagonise Russia and avoided interfering with the allies' shipping. While both sides of the Fourth Anglo-Dutch War tacitly understood it as an attempt to keep the Netherlands out of the League, Britain did not officially regard the alliance as hostile. Throughout the war, most of the naval stores of the Royal Navy continued to come from the Baltic Sea.

Endings 
The League ceased to have any practical function after the Treaty of Paris (1783) ended the war.

It was followed in the Napoleonic Wars by the Second League of Armed Neutrality, which was far less successful and ended after the British victory at the Battle of Copenhagen.

See also
 Diplomacy in the American Revolutionary War

References

Further reading
 De Madariaga, Isabel. Britain, Russia, and the Armed Neutrality of 1780: Sir James Harris's Mission to St. Petersburg During the American Revolution(Yale UP, 1962).

External links 
Russia's declaration of Armed Neutrality—from a Russian naval history

18th-century military alliances
1780s in Denmark
1780s in Norway
1780s in France
1780s in the Dutch Republic
1780s in the Kingdom of Naples
1780s in Portugal
1780s in Sweden
American Revolutionary War
Politics of the Russian Empire
Military history of Prussia
Diplomacy during the American Revolutionary War
1780s in the Ottoman Empire
Treaties of the Russian Empire
Treaties of the Holy Roman Empire
Treaties of the Kingdom of Prussia
Treaties of the Dutch Republic
Treaties of the Kingdom of Portugal
Treaties of the Ottoman Empire
Treaties of the Kingdom of Sicily
Treaties of the Kingdom of Naples
Treaties of Denmark–Norway
Russian Empire–United States relations